The earliest subgenres of Latin music is the corrido, a subgenre originating from popular music or Latin pop; a subclass of Latin music. Corrido music had its beginnings in Iberian folk in medieval Europe. The genre shared similarities to medieval cancioneros, through the European colonization of the Americas in the 15th century and the slave trade that followed, the lyrics were romanticized with heroic figures as the song's protagonist. Although the term "Latin music" varies between sources, the general consensus is that of genres originating in Latin America, the United States, and Iberian Peninsula, or music in Spanish. Although subgenres changes classification over time and various genres are clustered in subclasses of larger scopes, this timeline does not include regionalized identities of Latin music (e.g., "Dominican merengue", "Chilean folk", and "Puerto Rican salsa" for an example) are excluded in this list as they share or are under the same umbrella of their respective genres with slightly varying differences. Latin music is vastly large and it is impossible to include every subgenre on any list. Latin music shares a mixture of Indengious and European cultures, and in the 1550s included African influence. In the late 1700s, popular European dances and music, such as contradanzas and danzones, were introduced to Latin music. Through the 1800s, former colonies of Spain achieved independence and began performing narrative songs that were of national and local interest. The polka and accordion were introduced to Latin music in the 1860s, while Rosendo Mendizábal's "El Enterriano" (1897) became the first tango recording.

Subgenres of Latin music

See also 
Latin American music in the United States
Women in Latin music

Notes

References

Bibliography 

 - Read online, registration required

External links 
What Is Latin Music? About.com
Latin Music Genre Overview AllMusic
Latin Music Billboard
Latin Grammy

Latin American music

 
 
Lists of music genres